"If This Be My Destiny...!" is a story arc featuring the Marvel Comics superhero Spider-Man. It spans the issues The Amazing Spider-Man #31–33 (1965-1966), and was written by Stan Lee and Steve Ditko, the latter of whom also did the art. The story introduces supporting characters Harry Osborn and Gwen Stacy, Spider-Man's nemesis Doctor Octopus temporarily assuming the Master Planner alias, and Spider-Man being pinned under heavy machinery, which he lifts after gathering enough will power through thoughts of his family.

Background
The storyline ran in The Amazing Spider-Man #31 through #33, with a single interconnected story arc, being one of the first of its kind in Spider-Man's history.

Lee recounted that he and Ditko jointly plotted the acclaimed sequence in which Spider-Man lifts the heavy machinery off of him, but that stretching the sequence out for several pages was purely Ditko's idea. Having anticipated that Ditko would spend just two or three panels on this plot point, Lee said that when he saw the art for the scene "I almost shouted in triumph".

In the letters section of the September–October 1998 issue of Comic Book Marketplace, Ditko pointed out that he was credited as sole plotter of series starting with issue 26, and that the sequence in question was in issue 33. He further stated that Stan Lee never knew what was in Ditko's plotted stories until he saw the artwork.

Synopsis
Peter Parker attends his first day at Empire State University, meeting classmates Harry Osborn and Gwen Stacy. Meanwhile, Aunt May succumbs to a mysterious and life-threatening illness and a new evil mastermind called the "Master Planner" arranges for the theft of various technological devices. After a fateful battle, Spider-Man discovers that the Master Planner is none other than Doctor Octopus, and that he has stolen a rare isotope that could be the only means to save Aunt May's life. Doc Ock manages to escape, leaving Spider-Man trapped under heavy machinery.

Thinking about Uncle Ben's death and not wanting to lose Aunt May as well, Spider-Man is able to gather enough will power to lift the machinery, though his leg gets hurt while escaping from the flooding lab. He gives the serum to Dr. Curt Connors for analysis before delivering it to the hospital where May is treated, and takes some photographs for the Daily Bugle to raise money for May's hospital bills. When he returns to the hospital, Peter is relieved to learn the serum cured May, and goes home for some well deserved rest.

Reception
One of the most celebrated issues of the Lee-Ditko run is #33 (February 1966), the third part of the story arc "If This Be My Destiny", featuring the dramatic scene of Spider-Man who, through willpower and memories of his family, escapes from being pinned by heavy machinery. Comics historian Les Daniels noted that "Steve Ditko squeezes every ounce of anguish out of Spider-Man's predicament, complete with visions of the uncle he failed and the aunt he has sworn to save". Peter David observed that "after his origin, this two-page sequence from Amazing Spider-Man #33 is perhaps the best-loved sequence from the Stan Lee/Steve Ditko era". Steve Saffel stated the "full page Ditko image from The Amazing Spider-Man #33 is one of the most powerful ever to appear in the series and influenced writers and artists for many years to come". Matthew K. Manning wrote that "Ditko's illustrations for the first few pages of this Lee story included what would become one of the most iconic scenes in Spider-Man's history".

The story was chosen as #15 in the 100 Greatest Marvels of All Time poll of Marvel's readers in 2001. Editor Robert Greenberger wrote in his introduction to the story that "these first five pages are a modern-day equivalent to Shakespeare as Parker's soliloquy sets the stage for his next action. And with dramatic pacing and storytelling, Ditko delivers one of the great sequences in all comics".

In other media

Television
 Doctor Octopus uses the Master Planner alias in the episodes "Reinforcement" and "Shear Strength" of The Spectacular Spider-Man animated series. The latter episode also features a recreation of the iconic lifting scene, wherein Spider-Man is trapped under heavy debris in Doc Ock's underwater lab that is slowly flooding, and gathers enough will force to rescue himself and Gwen Stacy.
 An adaptation of the lifting scene appears in the episode "The Hobgoblin" [Pt. 2] of the 2017 Spider-Man animated series. The Hobgoblin destroys a suspended passage's supports and Spider-Man attempts to lift it and rescue the civilians trapped in a bus underneath, ultimately gathering the will power to do so thanks to a memory of Uncle Ben telling a young Peter that "the only time you lose is when you stop trying".

Film
 The storyline serves as one of the main inspirations for the 2004 film Spider-Man 2.
 An adaptation of the lifting scene appears in the 2017 film Spider-Man: Homecoming. When the Vulture destroys the support beams in his secret lair, Spider-Man is pinned under the debris, but gathers enough will power to lift the debris and escape.

Video games
 A scene where Spider-Man lifts debris off trapped civilians is played in Marvel's Spider-Man.

Collected editions
 Marvel Masterworks #16 (264 pages, hardcover, Marvel Comics, August 1991)
 The Essential Spider-Man volume 2 (530 pages, softcover, Marvel Comics, July 1997)
 Marvel Visionaries: Steve Ditko (352 pages, hardcover, Marvel Comics, 2005)
 The Amazing Spider-Man Omnibus volume 1 (1096 pages, hardcover, Marvel Comics, April 2007)

References

External links
 The Amazing Spider-Man (1963) - #31 "If This Be My Destiny...!" at the Comic Book DB

1965 in comics
Comics by Stan Lee
Comics by Steve Ditko
Superhero comics
Spider-Man storylines